Infinite Only is the sixth extended play released by the South Korean boy band, Infinite. It was released on September 19, 2016, by Woollim Entertainment. It is also the last album to feature member Hoya, before his departure from the group in August 2017.

Background and released 
On August 30, Infinite released teaser video and confirmed the upcoming new released date will be on September 19. On September 1, Infinite released "Logo Expansion" teaser video and confirmed the title of their new album, Infinite Only. From September 4 to September 11, Infinite released individual teaser images and videos. On September 12, Infinite released a group teaser image. On September 13, the title track "The Eye" teaser video was released, along with the album track list consisting of seven tracks. On September 18, an album preview was uploaded to Woollim's official YouTube channel. The official music video for "The Eye" and the group's sixth extended play was released on September 19.

Track listing

Awards and nominations

Music program awards

Release history

References 

2016 EPs
Infinite (group) EPs
Korean-language EPs
Woollim Entertainment EPs
Kakao M EPs